α-Isocomene synthase (EC 4.2.3.136, MrTPS2) is an enzyme with systematic name (2E,6E)-farnesyl-diphosphate diphosphate-lyase (cyclizing, (–)-α-isocomene-forming). This enzyme catalyses the following chemical reaction

 (2E,6E)-farnesyl diphosphate  (–)-α-isocomene + diphosphate

This enzyme is isolated from the roots of the plant Matricaria chamomilla var. recutita (chamomile).

References

External links 
 

EC 4.2.3